Archigraptis chrysodesma is a species of moth of the family Tortricidae. It is found in Papua New Guinea, Malaysia and Indonesia (Obi Major, West Irian, Moluccas).

References

Moths described in 1952
Tortricini
Moths of Asia